"Happy Violentine" is the third single from the Miss Kittin's first solo album I Com.

Critical reception
Derek Miller of Pitchfork Media described the song "Happy Violentine" as "a love song pulled inside out, a track that seems pleased to display its visceral heartbreak.

Music video
Laibach & Strup directed the animated music video for "Happy Violentine".

Live performances
Miss Kittin performed "Happy Violentine (Mr. G Remix)" live at the Sónar festival and included it on her album Live at Sónar.

Track listing
 "Happy Violentine (Marco Passarani San Valentino Remix) -	
 "Happy Violentine (Mad Professor Smiling Orange Dub) -	
 "Happy Violentine (Michael Mayer Remix) -

Charts

References

2004 songs
2005 singles
Miss Kittin songs
Electroclash songs
Songs written by Miss Kittin